Roze may refer to:

People
Janis Roze, herpetologist
Jean Roze, French textile producer
Pierre-Gustave Roze (1812–1862), French naval commander
Ernest Roze, French mycologist; see Marasmiaceae
Magdalena Roze, Australian meteorologist
Marie Roze, French singer
Mārtiņš Roze, Latvian politician
Nicolas Roze, French composer
Nicolas Roze (chevalier), French aristocrat
Pascale Roze, French playwright
Raymond Rôze, English composer
Roze, a pseudonym used by DJ Tiësto

Other uses
Róże, a village in Poland

See also
Rose (disambiguation)